Am730, is free daily Cantonese newspaper published in Hong Kong, the third with the prior two being Headline Daily and Metropolis Daily. Shih Wing-ching, chairman of Centaline Holdings, a property agency, is the founder of the newspaper. He introduced the new paper due to the unprecedented success of Metropolis Daily, a pioneer in this market. Metropolis Daily was founded in 2002, and was so successful that it broke even in only fourteen months. Realising the profitability of the market, Shih established am730 in late July 2005.

Overview 
Owned and operated by AM730 Media Limited, am730 launched its first publication on 30 July 2005. It had been scheduled to be launched in September, but it was rescheduled to 30 July to keep up with one of its competitors, Headline Daily, which was launched on 12 July 2005, and for convenient coincidence that the date of 30 July (730) corresponded with the name of the newspaper. Two hundred thousand copies of am730 were issued at its first publication and its current circulation volume is around three hundred thousand copies daily.

The name of the newspaper is intended to suggest a fresh approach towards the methodology of naming newspapers. It does not incorporate the term "daily" because this word reflects the conventional way of naming a news journal. The name literally states the newspaper's aim to distribute the publication during rush hour, which is approximately 7:30 am.

According to Shih, the newspaper is tailored to young people. 7:30 am is about when the sun rises; it signals vitality, just like the young people who are at the start of a long journey through life. It is a new vision aimed to change the old quality of Hong Kong newspapers. In its first week, am730 sold one hundred thousand copies. Eventually, it aims to increase circulation to three hundred thousand copies, which is similar to the other two free newspapers (Metropolis Daily: 300,000; Headline Daily: 400,000).

In January 2014, Shih revealed that many mainland companies were cancelling advertising with the paper, for its perceived anti-Beijing editorial stance.

Language and style
The journal tends to adopt internet slang and other expressions which are widely used on the Internet and popular among youth. The newspaper official says it is advisable to use internet slang and does not think that colloquial expressions in newspaper articles will affect young people's language proficiency. What is more crucial is using popular language to convey messages. am730 intends to offer a fresh sensation in news to its readers; it aims to widen the horizon of its readers, both internationally and culturally, and to promote an optimistic outlook on life and hopes for the future.

While being consistent with market regulations, am730 is a real newspaper which offers more attention to journalistic principles. Unlike numerous other newspapers, am730 is against the idea of indecent news as the selling point. It wants to provide a newspaper with accurate, simple news reports targeted to youth who have just begun their careers. The fresh, youthful style of am730 is designed to encourage more young people to read newspapers. Shih hopes that through this free newspaper, young people in Hong Kong will cultivate a greater interest in the news and in the future of Hong Kong.

Headline Daily, a newspaper which belongs to Sing Tao, is the primary competition for am730. Shih admits that Headline Daily has more resources than the privately investigated am730 because of its attachment to Sing Tao Daily, but that dependence on Sing Tao would harm the independence of its organisation.

Content 
The paper includes local, China, international, financial, entertainment and sports news. Additionally, Shih Wing Ching writes a column called "C Viewpoint" in which he gives his daily commentary on local or international news. "730 Angle" is also a commentary column, but for people from all walks of life. "Snapshot Hong Kong" is a column which cold-contacts youngsters on the street to ask their opinions. Hence, the major target of am730 is the young working class and it defines itself as a youth publication in the newspaper market. 

The detailed layout of the newspaper is as follows:

Front page
The lead story of the day occupies almost the entire page of the paper, filled in with colourful illustrations. The other stories vary from local top stories to China and international news.

Similar to a traditional newspaper, on the left corner is a column which briefly highlights the news of secondary importance that is available inside the paper. The highlights vary, including local, China, international, entertainment and sport news. At the bottom of the column is a display of the Mark Six results.

Local
Typically, around three to four pages are allocated to the local news section. More important news such as politics and policies are reported in greater length than city news such as accidents and events. To maximise space usage, even the banner at the top of the page is used to cover brief news accounts. Shih's personal column, "C Viewpoint," can also be found in this section.

There is also a column for weather forecasts for local, China and international locations. The banner of this section is sky-blue in colour.

China
News from China and related to China's interests takes up about one to two pages of the paper. The banner colour of this section is khaki.

International
The international section covers major news around the world. The banner colour of this section is dark blue.

Features
When this section appears, it is placed in the middle of the paper and covers two pages, but it is not always printed. At times, the middle pages are occupied by a full-page advertisement. Feature stories, when available, offer in-depth reports and analysis.

Finance
This is a short, concise one-page section on financial and business news, both locally and on the international arena. The banner colour of this section is dark green.

Sports
The Sports section covers both the local and the international sports scene. On average it provides a scoreboard summary of final scores and, on occasion, a brief schedule of live sports coverage on television. The banner colour of this section is light green.

I.T.
The I.T. section is dedicated to news of technological advancement and electronic products, including mobile phones, computers, television and much more. Not to be missed is news of the Internet and recommended websites. The banner colour of this section is light green.

Notes
The Notes section usually offers articles of interesting, sometimes absurd events happening around the world. The banner colour of this section is purple.

OL (Office Lady) and Health
This section is dedicated to young working women, similar to those offered in popular women's magazines. Besides tips and advice on women's health and beauty, there is also a section dedicated to relationship advice for women readers with personal problems. The banner colour of this section is pink.

Entertainment
This section offers entertainment news regarding celebrities, music and movies. There are usually two pages dedicated to this section. One page focuses on local Hong Kong celebrities, while the other covers international celebrities. There are occasional extras in this section such as movie reviews and basic introductions of a foreign language. The banner colour of this section is mustard yellow.

Readers
"730 Angle" offers letters and readers' opinions on various issues. There is also a small section on events and book reviews. On the right hand corner is a "snapshot" section dedicated to teen fashion and trends, including the mobile phones they use.

Leisure
This section that relates tips and overviews of leisure activities. Generally this section contains comics, western horoscopes, tarot predictions of the future, and cooking tips and recipes.

Television
This section provides a selected schedule of programmes offered on both local and cable television. At the bottom section, there is a review of some recommended programs. Last but not least are the credits of the editorial team as well as a list of contacts for the newspaper.

Back page
The back page of the paper is typically occupied by a full-page advertisement.

Generally, the news accounts presented are brief and limited, due at least in part to space limitations. As am730 is a free newspaper, the operating cost largely depends on the advertisement revenue. A full-page advertisement appears on every other page, mainly placed between the local news section and the finance section. Smaller advertisements are scattered throughout the newspaper.

Editorial team 
Currently, the editorial team consists of 50 people. Key staff are :

President: Alan Lo
Vice-President: Danny Fung and Ricky Lo
Sales and Marketing Director: Ray Lee
Associate Managing Editor: Dominic Leung
Marketing Manager: Agnes Chen
Chief Reporter: Kenneth Dai
General Chief Reporter: Ray Tsang
Photography Director: Edmond Wong
Arts Director: Spring Kwok

Operations 
The initial launch of the newspaper cost up to HK$100 million. It was Shih's private investment. At the first stage, working capital was just HK$50 million; another HK$50 million will be invested if the operation proves successful. Shih Wing-ching expects that revenue and expenditures will be balanced after a year of publication.

As a free newspaper, the major operational revenue is gained from commercial advertisements. After the first month of publication, the revenue gained from commercial advertisements was HK$100 million while am730 still needed to bear HK$100 million to HK$200 million in losses every day. The advertising rates in am730 are estimated to be HK$24,000 – HK$30,000, 30% to 40% lower than Metropolis Daily'''s rates of HK$32,000 to HK$40,000. This is a strategic action to attract more advertisements.

From July 2013, under a six-year contract, the paper is printed by the South China Morning Post Group.

 Distribution points am730 is distributed from Mondays to Fridays (except public holidays) at around 287 locations. Distribution locations include railway stations along the East Rail line and West Rail line, the entrances of Mass Transit Railway (MTR) stations, private residential areas, and many points in the Central business district (or CBD).

Due to limited human resources and the specific target group of am730, early distribution points were not as efficient. Its main focus is now in the commercial districts of Hong Kong such as Central, Wan Chai and Tsim Sha Tsui.

 Other services 

 Online papers am730 is also accessible online. Besides viewing the most recent issue, readers can also view archived issues of am730 online. The e-paper is formatted in such a way that it resembles the actual printed paper.

 See also 
 Media in Hong Kong
 Newspapers of Hong Kong
 Free daily newspapers

 References 

New free newspaper sets sights on young in battle with Metro – AsiaMedia, South China Morning Post, Kristine Kwok. Retrieved 28 June 2005.
HONG KONG: Free dailies take a bite of broadsheets' ad pie – AsiaMedia, South China Morning Post, Frederick Yeung. Retrieved 23 September 2005
Another free paper in Hong Kong – SEBC.
Environmental problem caused by free newspaper – "Gather free newspaper practice of residents and its relations to environmental issues". A survey conducted by Democratic Alliance for the Betterment and Progress of Hong Kong.
Synovate Media Atlas Pilot Exercise: Hong Kong – Synovate Research''

External links 
am730 official website (Chinese)
Distribution locations of am730 (Chinese)
News about am730 (Chinese article)

Chinese-language newspapers published in Hong Kong
Free daily newspapers
Newspapers established in 2005
2005 establishments in Hong Kong